Luigi Miraglia (31 May 1846 – 23 September 1903) was a university law professor who served between 1895 and 1897 as rector of the University of Naples.   During his final years he made the switch to national politics, appointed to the Italian Senate on 14 June 1900.   He also served as Mayor of Naples between 30 November 1901 and his death.

Biography 
Luigi Miraglia was born at the extreme south of the Italian Peninsula in Reggio Calabria.   His elder brother, Giuseppe Miraglia (1834–1896), would also become a senator. 

He was still only 20 when he graduated from the University of Naples with a law degree.   On 22 October 1874, having won a public competition for the post, he started work as Professor of Law, political economy and Statistics at the "Scuola superiore di agricoltura di Portici" (agricultural college) which had recently been created in the old Palace of Portici, along the coast near the site of Herculaneum, to the south-east of the city.  One and a half years later he transferred to the University of Naples, installed on 15 March 1876 as Professor in charge of Pedagogy.   He accepted a full professorship of philosophy on 14 March 1902, retaining his teaching chair for the rest of his life.   Within the philosophy department he taught Jurisprudence.   A succession of promotions on the administrative side accompanied his academic responsibilities.   He was appointed University Dean in 1884 and University Rector on 8 October 1895.  

Miraglia was nominated to the senate in June 1900.   However, in November 1901 he was unexpectedly invited by Neapolitan city politicians to accept appointment as Mayor of Naples.   On paying tribute to Miraglia following his death, the president of the senate described this as "a dangerous honour", while paying tribute to the intellectual and moral abilities which enabled the new mayor to resolve the "disorder and collapse" into which the city administration of Naples had fallen prior to his appointment.   Luigi Miraglia died suddenly in Naples slightly less than two years into his mayoral term.

References 

1846 births
1903 deaths
19th-century jurists
19th-century Italian jurists
19th-century Italian philosophers
19th-century Italian politicians
Academic staff of the University of Naples Federico II
Members of the Senate of the Kingdom of Italy
Mayors of Naples

People from Reggio Calabria
Jurists from Naples